Julius Foss (21 April 1879 – 26 June 1953) was a Danish composer and organist.

See also
List of Danish composers

References
This article was initially translated from the Danish Wikipedia.

Danish composers
Male composers
Danish classical organists
Male classical organists
Danish jazz guitarists
1879 births
1953 deaths
Male jazz musicians